The Ministry of Interior (MoI; Arabic: وزارة الداخلية) is one of the governmental bodies of Saudi Arabia responsible for national security, naturalization, immigration, and customs in Saudi Arabia. It was founded in 1926 by King Abdulaziz, but the organization was reformed in 1951 when the combined ministerial body covering financial and interior affairs were separated. The current minister of interior is Abdulaziz bin Saud Al Saud, who has been in office since 21 June 2017.

History
The Ministry of Interior was created in 1926 by King Abdulaziz as a solution to the end of political unrest, tribal conflicts, and statelessness caused by the absence of a powerful central government. The goal of the organization is to serve the citizens and residents of Saudi Arabia, achieving security, stability, and tranquility.

Objectives and Responsibilities
The minister of interior has several objectives and summarizes its mission as follows:

 Achieve security and stability Kingdom-wide, provide tranquility and safety for the citizens and fight against all means of crime to ensure the safety of Saudi society and its development.
 Ensure safety of Pilgrims in order to perform their rituals safely.
 Reinforce security relationships with neighboring Arab countries and cooperate with the Countries of Gulf Cooperation Council (GCC), to maintain safety in the Kingdom and abroad, control crime and drug smuggling, exchange security information, organize citizenship regulations and systems and other miscellaneous issues.
 Reinforce security cooperation with Arab countries to protect cultural possessions and achievements, support internal and external security, control crime, terrorism and drug smuggling and develop Arab security institutions.

Divisions of Internal Security
The history and formation of the MOI and its various sectors passed through phases of administrative development and organization. The ministry consists of the following child agencies:

MOI Agency for Military Affairs
Crime Research Center
General Directorate of Narcotics Control
General Directorate of Public Security
Security Forces Organization
Premises Security Forces Command
General Directorate of Border Guards
General Department of Weapons and Explosives
General Directorate of Civil Defence
Ministerial Agency of Civil Affairs

MOI Agency for Security Capabilities
National Information Center
Development Projects Center
General Administration of Mujahideen 
High Commission for Industrial Security
General Directorate of Passports
King Fahad Security College
General Directorate of Prisons
National Center for Security Operations
Saudi National Central Bureau of Interpol
General Department of Medical Services
Special Forces for Security and Protection

List of ministers

 Faisal bin Abdulaziz (1931–1934)
 Abdullah bin Faisal Al Saud (1951–1959)
 Faisal bin Abdulaziz (1959–1960)
 Musaid bin Abdul Rahman Al Saud (1960)
 Abdul Muhsin bin Abdulaziz Al Saud (1960–1961)
 Faisal bin Turki I bin Abdulaziz Al Saud (1961–1962)
 Fahd bin Abdulaziz Al Saud (1962–1975)
 Nayef bin Abdulaziz Al Saud (11 October 1975 – 16 June 2012)
 Ahmed bin Abdulaziz Al Saud (18 June 2012 – 5 November 2012)
 Muhammad bin Nayef Al Saud (5 November 2012 – 21 June 2017)
 Abdulaziz bin Saud Al Saud (21 June 2017 – present)

Aircraft inventory

See also

References

 
1951 establishments in Saudi Arabia
Government ministries of Saudi Arabia
Saudi
Ministries established in 1951